Dolzhanskaya is a rural locality (a stanitsa) in Yeysky District of Krasnodar Krai, Russia, located on the coast of the Azov Sea, at the base of Dolgaya Spit.  Population:  

It is a popular windsurfing location. It has mineral waters and mud with alleged medical properties.

References

Rural localities in Krasnodar Krai
Yeysky District
Kuban Oblast